In the mathematical theory of automorphic forms, a converse theorem gives sufficient conditions for a Dirichlet series to be the Mellin transform of a modular form. More generally a converse theorem states that a representation of an algebraic group over the adeles is automorphic whenever the L-functions of various twists of it are well behaved.

Weil's converse theorem

Weil's extension states that if  not only the Dirichlet series

but also its twists 

by some Dirichlet characters χ,  satisfy  suitable functional equations relating values at s and 1−s, then the Dirichlet series is essentially the Mellin transform of a modular form of some level.

Higher dimensions

J. W. Cogdell, H. Jacquet, I. I. Piatetski-Shapiro and J. Shalika have extended the converse theorem to automorphic forms on some higher-dimensional groups, in particular GLn and GLm×GLn, in a long series of papers.

References

External links
 Cogdell's papers on converse theorems

Automorphic forms